Liz Holliday is a British editor and writer of science fiction and mystery.

Life and early career
Holliday has been a teacher and a youth leader, owned a bookshop and run a theatre company.

The Guinness Book of Records listed her for playing an 84-hour non-stop Dungeons & Dragons marathon.

Literary career
Holliday edited the magazines Odyssey and 3SF, and was fiction editor for Valkyrie magazine for its first thirteen issues.

She has written novelisations of British television programmes, including Cracker and Soldier Soldier.

Holliday's short stories have appeared in numerous anthologies and magazines, including Dragon. Her story "And She Laughed" was adapted for television as an episode of The Hunger in 1999.

She has also written material for role-playing games such as Star Wars and C°ntinuum.

Bibliography

Short fiction
"Third Person Singular" (Temps, Volume 1, 1991)
"Blind Fate" (Weerde, Volume 1, 1992)
"El Lobo Dorado Is Dead, Is Dead"  (Temps, Volume 2: Eurotemps, 1992)
"The Only Good Orc" (Dragon magazine, August 1993)
"Cover Story" (Weerde, Volume 2: The Book of the Ancients, 1993)
"And She Laughed" (London Noir; Serpent's Tail, 1994; reprinted in Year's 25 Finest Crime and Mystery Stories, 1995)
"This Is the Universe" (The Ultimate Alien, 1995; reprinted in Futura magazine, 2005)
"The Knight of Good Heart" (Tales of the Round Table, Past Times, 1997)
"Burning Bright" (Decalog 4: Re-Generations, Dr Who Books, 1997) Earned a "year's best" honourable mention from Gardner Dozois.
"Miri's Story" (Rath and Storm, Wizards of the Coast, 1998)
"Provenance" (Royal Whodunnits, 1999)
"Better Forget" (Cemetery Sonata, 1999)
"By The Cold of the Moon" (Extreme Fantasy 2, 2001)
"After Camlann" (Time After Time, 2005)
"All of Me" (Aeon Magazine, August 2006) Earned a "year's best" honourable mention from Gardner Dozois.
"Fletcher's Ghost" (Ages of Wonder, 2009)
"Another Day" (Hardboiled Horror, forthcoming)

TV novelisations
Cracker
One Day a Lemming Will Fly, published 1998, 
The Big Crunch, published 1995, 
True Romance, published 1995, 
Soldier Soldier
Tucker's Story
Damage, published 1995, 
Thief Takers
Bramwell, published 1995, 
Bugs: Hot Metal, published 1996, 
Staying Alive
Reckless

References

External links
Official website

Liz Holliday List of articles for Focus, 1988-1990.

English magazine editors
English mystery writers
English science fiction writers
English fantasy writers
Writers from London
Year of birth missing (living people)
Living people
Women mystery writers
Women science fiction and fantasy writers
Women magazine editors